Andrew Michael Gordon Sharpe, Baron Sharpe of Epsom,  (born June 1965) is a British broker and politician based in Surrey, serving as  Parliamentary Under-Secretary of State in the Home Office since September 2022. He was the President of the National Conservative Convention from 2017 to 2018 and has been its Chairman since July 2018. He is also Vice Chair of the Policy Forum. He has worked to promote voluntary involvement in senior levels of the Conservative Party's organisation.

Sharpe was nominated for a Life Peerage in the 2020 Political Honours by Prime Minister Boris Johnson. He was created Baron Sharpe of Epsom on 15 September and introduced to the House of Lords on 12 October. He made his maiden speech on 16 December 2020. He was appointed to the front bench in October 2021 in Johnson's Reshuffle.

References

1965 births
Living people
Conservative Party (UK) life peers
Life peers created by Elizabeth II
Officers of the Order of the British Empire